Turku observatory may refer to:

Vartiovuori observatory, an old observatory building in Turku, Finland
Iso-Heikkilä Observatory, a former university observatory in Iso-Heikkilä district of Turku, now used by amateur astronomers
Tuorla Observatory of the department of astronomy at the University of Turku in Finland